Juozas Balčikonis Gymnasium is a secondary state school located in Panevėžys, Lithuania. Teaching started in 1727, however, school reorganised to gymnasium in 1858, making it the oldest gymnasium type school in Lithuania. Juozo Balčikonio gimnazija is always one of the top-ranked institutions in the Lithuania for the high quality of its teaching, long lasting traditions and notable alumni.

History of Names 
School of Piarists – 1727-1832
School of Gentries – 1841-1865
Realschool – 1882-1915
Panevėžys Gymnasium – 1915-1949
Secondary School No. 1 – 1949-1970
Juozas Balčikonis Gymnasium – 1970-current

Notable alumni

Ministers and prime ministers 
 Antanaitis Vaidotas
 Birulis Kostas
 Jankevičius Juozas
 Juodakis Petras
 Masiliūnas Jonas
 Šakenis Konstantinas
 Juozas Urbšys
 Jonas Černius

Diplomats 
 Stasys Antanas Bačkis
 Jasinevičius Raimundas
 Morkvėnas Rimantas
 Juozas Urbšys
 Klevečka Rimutis

Public Figures 
 Cesevičius Domas
 Didžiulis Stanislovas
 Domaševičius Adolfas-Damušis
 Dausa Kazys
 Jurgutis Vytautas
 Jurskis Algirdas
 Macijauskas Antanas
 Skuodis Vytautas
 Šilas Povilas
 Vaišvilaitė Irena
 Vaitiekūnas Lionginas
 Petras Vileišis

Writers and Publicists 
 Antanaitis Algirdas Titus
 Astrauskas Gediminas
 Babickas Petras
 Barauskas-Barėnas Kazys
 Būtėnas Vladas-Ramojus
 Čerkesas Juozas-Besprnis
 Čibas Daumantas
 Dauguvietis Borisas
 Drevinis Paulius
 Graičiūnas Jonas
 Inčiūra Kazys
 Inčiūra Kazys-Pranas
 Jokubka Jonas Stanislovas
 Jonuška Vincas
 Keliuotis Juozas
 Kesiūnas Povilas
 Petrulis Juozas
 Račiūnas Simas
 Henrikas Radauskas
 Raila Bronys
 Rutkauskas Benediktas-Rutkūnas
 Balys Sruoga
 Rapolas Šaltenis
 Šukys Jonas
 Tamašauskaitė Vanda-Frankienė-Vaitkevičienė
 Tilvytis Teofilis
 Zaborskaitė Vanda
 Zupka Kazys-Kecioris

Philologists 
 Balkevičius Jonas
 Jurgutytė Liucija-Baldauf
 Lyberis Antanas
 Skardžius Pranas
 Subatniekas Valteris
 Šukys Jonas
 Valkūnas Leonas

Architects, painters, sculptors 
 Bielinskis Feliksas
 Bernardas Bučas
 Stasys Eidrigevičius
 Gaidamavičiūtė Violeta
 Garbauskas Antanas
 Gudelis Vytautas
 Jokūbonis Gediminas
 Jusionis Stasys
 Kerbedis Stanislovas
 Remigijus Kriukas
 Naruševičius Kazys
 Navakas Vaclovas Algimantas
 Ničius Algirdas
 Pazukaitė Vanda
 Algirdas Petrulis
 Puodžiukaitytė Giedrė
 Sklėrius Kajetonas
 Stepanka Albertas
 Laurynas Gucevičius
 Švipas Vladas
 Domicėlė Tarabildienė
 Žoromskis Kazimieras

Signers of the Declaration of Lithuania's Independence 
 Rimantas Astrauskas
 Balčas Stasys
 Kazys Bizauskas
 Kvieska Vincas
 Mikutienė Dangutė
 Gabrielė Petkevičaitė-Bitė
 Alfonsas Petrulis
 Stakauskaitė Salomėja
 Šakenis Konstantinas
 Kazimieras Steponas Šaulys
 Uždavinys Ignacas
 Vaižmužis Albinas

Clergy 
 Balčys Kęstutis Robertas
 Barauskas Bronius
 Bikinas Juozapas, publicist
 Čiplys Kazimieras-Vijūnas, writer
 Jatulevičius Paulius-Jatulis, historian
 Juodelis Jonas, dr.
 Antanas Juška, dr.
 Katelė Jonas
 Kuzminskas Kazimieras
 Legeckas Petras
 Lipnickas Alfonsas-Lipniūnas
 Meškauskas Juozas, prof.
 Narbutas Titas, publicist
 Paliulionis Mečislovas
 Rimkevičius Petras, poet
 Sereika Feliksas
 Juozapas Skvireckas
 Valantinas Antanas, poet
 Antanas Vienažindys, poet
 Zaremba Leonas, prof.
 Žitkevičius Vincas-Vincas Stonis, poet

Athletes 
 Jonas Kazlauskas
 Vitoldas Masalskis
 Rimantas Plungė
 Raimundas Sargūnas

Notable Academicians and Teachers 
 Kuzma Vladas
 Jablonskis Konstantinas
 Lebedev Aleksandr
 Juozas Balčikonis
 Pakarklis Povilas
 Brazdžiūnas Povilas
 Jurginis Juozas
 Vanagas Vladas Eimutis
 Gudelis Vytautas
 Rajeckas Raimundas
 Rajeckas Valentinas
 Marcinkevičius Algimantas
 Pragarauskas Henrikas
 Krotkus Arūnas
 Laurinčikas Antanas
 Tamošiūnas Vytas
 Raudys Šarūnas
 Birulia Aleksandr
 Baleišis Vladas
 Bizauskas Kazimieras
 Bortkevičius Silvestras
 Bulzgys Juozas
 Dambrauskas Aleksandras-Jakštas
 Daugaravičius Antanas
 Dilka Vincas
 Gabulaitė Elena
 Grigonis Matas
 Jonas Jablonskis
 Jovaiša Kazys
 Kairiūkštis Vytautas
 Karka Mykolas
 Kliuksinas Karolis
 Kuodys Leonas
 Maksimaitienė Ona
 Paulauskas Vladas
 Gabrielė Petkevičaitė-Bitė
 Puodžiukaitis Benediktas
 Puronas Bronius
 Puzinas Povilas
 Rukša Antanas
 Salomėja Stakauskaitė
 Stakauskas Juozapas
 Truncė Kazimieras
 Urbas Dominykas
 Vaitkevičius Antanas
 Variakojis Vilius
 Juozas Zikaras

References 

Buildings and structures in Panevėžys
Schools in Lithuania
1727 establishments in Europe
History of education in Lithuania